Campos Altos is a Brazilian municipality located in the west of the state of Minas Gerais. Its population  was estimated to be 15,563 people living in a total area of 719 km². The city belongs to the mesoregion of Triângulo Mineiro and Alto Paranaíba and to the micro-region of Araxá.  It became a municipality in 1944.

Campos Altos is located at an elevation of 1,050 meters, 85 km. east of Araxá on highway BR-216.  The distance to the state capital, Belo Horizonte, is 264 km.   Neighboring  municipalities are:  Rio Paranaíba (N), São Gotardo (NE), Santa Rosa da Serra (E), Córrego Danta, (SE) Tapiraí (S), Pratinha (SW), and Ibiá (W).

The Ferrovia da Centro Atlântica, a railroad line used for cargo, passes through the town.

The GDP in 2005 was approximately R$133 million, with 53 million reais from services, 4 million reais from industry, and 69 million reais from agriculture.  There were 549 rural producers on 48,000 hectares of land.  The land is very fertile and agricultural production is high.  168 farms had tractors (2006).  Approximately 2,000 persons were dependent on agriculture.  The main crops are coffee (8,500 hectares planted in 2006)) while soybeans, potatoes, wheat, and corn were also grown.  There were 25,000 head of cattle (2006).  There were 2 banks (2007): Banco Itaú, Banco do Brasil
and Sicoob/Crediagro.  There were 1,988 automobiles (2007), giving a ratio of 6 inhabitants per automobile.

There were 8 health clinics and 1 hospital with 37 beds (2005).  Patients with more serious health conditions are transported to Araxá, which is connected by good roads.  Educational needs were met by 3 primary schools, 1 middle school, and 6 pre-primary schools.

Municipal Human Development Index: 0.786 (2000)
State ranking: 90 out of 853 municipalities 
National ranking: 901 out of 5,138 municipalities  
Literacy rate: 87%
Life expectancy: 74 (average of males and females)

In 2000 the per capita monthly income of R$251.00 was below the state and national average of R$276.00 and R$297.00 respectively.

The highest ranking municipality in Minas Gerais in 2000 was Poços de Caldas with 0.841, while the lowest was Setubinha with 0.568.  Nationally the highest was São Caetano do Sul in São Paulo with 0.919, while the lowest was Setubinha.  In more recent statistics (considering 5,507 municipalities) Manari in the state of Pernambuco has the lowest rating in the country—0,467—putting it in last place.

See also 
 List of municipalities in Minas Gerais

References

External links 
Prefeitura Municipal de Campos Altos

Municipalities in Minas Gerais